Frank Higham (8 July 1905–1975) was an English footballer who played in the Football League for Coventry City, Walsall and Wolverhampton Wanderers.

References

1905 births
1975 deaths
English footballers
Association football midfielders
English Football League players
Daventry Town F.C. players
Walsall F.C. players
Wolverhampton Wanderers F.C. players
Coventry City F.C. players
Lincoln City F.C. players
Worcester City F.C. players
Nuneaton Borough F.C. players
Evesham Town F.C. players
Hereford United F.C. players